Sandrider is an American grunge metal band from Seattle, Washington. The band is currently composed of former Akimbo band members Jon Weisnewski and Nat Damm, as well as Jesse Roberts from The Ruby Doe. As of 2016 the band has released three full-length albums and a split EP with Kinski on Good to Die Records.

Members
 Jon Weisnewski - guitar / vocals
 Nat Damm - drums
 Jesse Roberts - bass / vocals

Discography
 Sandrider (2011)
 Godhead (2013)
 Sandrider + Kinski Split EP (2015)
 Armada (2018)
 Enveletration (2023)

References

External links
 Official Bandcamp page

American grunge groups
Heavy metal musical groups from Washington (state)